This is a list of Peruvian literary figures, including poets, novelists, children's writers, essayists, and scholars.

 Martín Adán (1908–1985), poet
 Ciro Alegría (1909–1967), indigenist novelist
 Marie Arana (born 1949), Peruvian-American novelist, biographer, journalist
 José María Arguedas (1911–1969), indigenist novelist and poet
 Federico Barreto (1862–1929), poet
 Michael Bentine (1922–1996), Anglo-Peruvian comedian
 Alfredo Bryce Echenique (born 1939), novelist
 Guillermo Carnero Hoke (1917–1985), writer and journalist
 Carlos Castaneda (1925–1998), literary anthropologist
 Gamaliel Churata (1897–1957), socialist essayist and journalist
 José María Eguren (1874–1942), poet
 Jorge Eduardo Eielson (1924–2006), poet
 Inca Garcilaso de la Vega (c. 1539–1616), the first mestizo chronicler
 Manuel González Prada (1844–1918), modernista poet
 Eduardo González Viaña (born 1941), short story writer and novelist
 Javier Heraud (1942–1963), poet and guerrillero
 Rodolfo Hinostroza (born 1941), influential poet, writer, novelist and essayist
 Luis Jochamowitz (born 1953), journalist and biographer
 José Carlos Mariátegui (1894–1930), socialist essayist and journalist
 Jose Luis Mejia (born 1969), poet, novelist
 Gloria Macher Peruvian Canadian writer
 María Emma Mannarelli (born 1954), feminist writer, historian, professor
 Clorinda Matto de Turner (1853–1909), novelist
 Scarlett O'Phelan Godoy (born 1951), historian
 Angélica Palma (1878–1935), writer, journalist and biographer
 Clemente Palma (1872–1946), writer of fantastic and horror fiction 
 Ricardo Palma (1833–1919), writer
 Felipe Guaman Poma de Ayala, indigenous chronicler
 Santiago Roncagliolo (born 1975), writer, scriptwriter, translator and journalist
 Julio Ramón Ribeyro (1929–1994), short story writer
 Isabel Sabogal (born 1958), novelist, poet and translator
 Sebastián Salazar Bondy (1924–1964), essayist and poet
 Claudia Salazar Jiménez (born 1976) writer, editor and academic
 José Santos Chocano (1875–1934), poet
 Manuel Scorza (1928–1983), novelist and poet
 Carlos Thorne Boas (born 1923), novelist, writer and lawyer
 Álvaro Torres-Calderón (born 1975), poet
 Abraham Valdelomar (1888–1919)
 Blanca Varela (1926–2009), poet
 Mario Vargas Llosa (born 1936), novelist of the Latin American Boom
 Virginia Vargas (born 1945), sociologist
 Cesar Vallejo (1892–1938), influential  poet, writer, journalist
 José Watanabe (1946–2007), poet
 Carlos Yushimito (born 1977), writer
 Gunter Silva Passuni (born 1977), writer
 Renato Cisneros (born 1976)
 Daniel Alarcón (born 1977), novelist
 Mario Bellatin (born 1960)
 Santiago Roncagliolo (born 1975), novelist
 Ciro Alegría (1909-1967)
 Jaime Bayly (born 1965), novelist
 Iván Thays (born 1968), writer
 Esteban Pavletich Trujillo (1906-1981), poet, novelist, essayist

See also 
 List of Latin American writers
 Peruvian literature

Peruvian
 List
Writers

cs:Seznam kanadských spisovatelů